Melaleuca styphelioides, known as the prickly-leaved paperbark or prickly paperbark, is a plant native to eastern Australia. It is a tree with spongy bark, prickly leaves and spikes of creamy-white flowers.

Description
The spongy bark is white or light brown and peels off in large strips. They are slightly twisted, have sharply-pointed tips, are arranged alternately on the branchlets and have between 15 and 30 veins.

Often new growth appears at the end of the spikes. Following flowering, grey-brown, woody capsules appear in clusters along the branchlets.

Taxonomy
The species was first formally described in 1797 by botanist James Edward Smith in Transactions of the Linnean Society of London from plant material collected by David Burton near Port Jackson. The specific epithet (styphelioides) refers to the  similarity of the leaves of this species with those of a plant in the genus Styphelia in the family Ericaceae.

Distribution and habitat
The species occurs along stream banks or other moist situations, mostly in coastal areas from Nowra in New South Wales and northwards in to Queensland.

Use in horticulture
This melaleuca thrives in a variety of situations ranging from swampy to hot and dry, and due to its deep-rooting characteristics lawn can be grown under its canopy. It is used as a street tree in Sydney, with good examples in Campsie, an inner southwestern suburb, and also along numerous streets in various suburbs of Greater Melbourne.

Gallery

References

Flora of New South Wales
Flora of Queensland
styphelioides
Myrtales of Australia
Plants described in 1797